In the mathematical fields of graph theory and combinatorics, a matching polynomial (sometimes called an acyclic polynomial) is a generating function of the numbers of matchings of various sizes in a graph. It is one of several graph polynomials studied in algebraic graph theory.

Definition
Several different types of matching polynomials have been defined. Let G be a graph with n vertices and let mk be the number of k-edge matchings.

One matching polynomial of G is

Another definition gives the matching polynomial as

A third definition is the polynomial

Each type has its uses, and all are equivalent by simple transformations.  For instance,

and

Connections to other polynomials
The first type of matching polynomial is a direct generalization of the rook polynomial.

The second type of matching polynomial has remarkable connections with orthogonal polynomials.  For instance, if G = Km,n, the complete bipartite graph, then the second type of matching polynomial is related to the generalized Laguerre polynomial Lnα(x) by the identity:

 

If G is the complete graph Kn, then MG(x) is an Hermite polynomial:
 
where Hn(x) is the "probabilist's Hermite polynomial" (1) in the definition of Hermite polynomials.

If G is a forest, then its matching polynomial is equal to the characteristic polynomial of its adjacency matrix.

If G is a path or a cycle, then MG(x) is a Chebyshev polynomial. In this case
μG(1,x) is a Fibonacci polynomial or Lucas polynomial respectively.

Complementation
The matching polynomial of a graph G with n vertices is related to that of its complement by a pair of (equivalent) formulas.

There is a similar relation for a subgraph G of Km,n and its complement in Km,n.  This relation, due to Riordan (1958), was known in the context of non-attacking rook placements and rook polynomials.

Applications in chemical informatics
The Hosoya index of a graph G, its number of matchings, is used in chemoinformatics as a structural descriptor of a molecular graph. It may be evaluated as mG(1) .

Computational complexity
On arbitrary graphs, or even planar graphs, computing the matching polynomial is #P-complete . However, it can be computed more efficiently when additional structure about the graph is known. In particular,
computing the matching polynomial on n-vertex graphs of treewidth k is fixed-parameter tractable: there exists an algorithm whose running time, for any fixed constant k, is a polynomial in n with an exponent that does not depend on k .
The matching polynomial of a graph with n vertices and clique-width k may be computed in time nO(k) .

References 
.
.
.
.
.
.
.
.

Algebraic graph theory
Matching (graph theory)
Polynomials
Graph invariants